May Vokes ( – September 13, 1957) was an American actress and comedienne. She appeared primarily in comedic roles in stage plays. Her Broadway appearances included A Fool and His Money, The Quaker Girl, and The Bat. She appeared in the films Janice Meredith in 1924 and Get That Venus in 1933.

Vokes was born near Columbus, Ohio. She first acted in a student production while attending a convent school. She later moved to Chicago, where a former classmate got her an acting job. 

Vokes was married to Ballard Preston Lester, whose name was reported as Robert. She died at Stamford Hospital on September 13, 1957, in Stamford, Connecticut.

References

External links
 
 

1880s births
1957 deaths
American stage actresses
American film actresses
Date of birth missing
Actresses from Chicago
20th-century American actresses
Actresses from Columbus, Ohio
Broadway theatre people